Sara Kristine Bantan Eggesvik (born April 29, 1997) is a footballer who plays as a midfielder for the 1. divisjon club KIL/Hemne. Born in Norway, she represents the Philippines women's national team.

Personal life
Eggesvik was born in Bodø, Norway, to a Norwegian father and a Filipino mother from the Davao Region. Eggesvik credits her older brother for introducing her to football, and she was encouraged to take up the sport after witnessing him play throughout their youth. She regularly visits her maternal relatives in Davao during the holiday season. 

Eggesvik is a medical student. However, she said that she is considering delaying her studies to focus on her football career.

Career

Youth
The Bodø-born Eggesvik had her youth career at Grand Bodø.

Grand Bodø
In 2014, Eggesvik was promoted to the first team of Grand Bodø. At 17 years and 10 days old, she made her debut for the club in a 3–0 defeat against LSK Kvinner. She made a total of 103 appearances for the club, scoring 8 goals.

Charlton Athletic
In January 2019, Eggesvik joined Women's Championship club Charlton Athletic on a free transfer.

Loan to Grand Bodø
In May 2019, Eggesvik was sent back on loan to her previous club.

KIL/Hemne
In 2020, Eggesvik returned to Norway and joined KIL/Hemne.

Malvik
In 2022, Eggesvik joined Adressa-ligaen 3. div. women club Malvik.

International career
Eggesvik was born in Norway to a Norwegian father and a Filipino mother making her eligible to play for either Norway or Philippines at international level.

Norway youth
Eggesvik has represented Norway women's at under-19 and under-23 levels.

U-19
In January 2016, Eggesvik was one of the 20 players who were called-up for the international friendlies against England U-19. She made her debut for Norway U-19 in a 1–0 win against England U-19, coming in as a substitute, replacing Nora Eide Lie in the 66th minute of the match.

U-23
In August 2018, Eggesvik was called-up for the  2018 Under-23 Women’s Nordic Tournament matches against England U-23, Sweden U-23 and United States U-23.  She made her debut for Norway U-23 in a 2–0 win against Sweden U-23, coming in as a substitute, replacing Andrea Norheim in the 61st minute of the match.

Philippines
In June 2022, Eggesvik was included in the Philippines squad for the national team's training camp in Europe. The training camp was part of the national team's preparation for the 2022 AFF Women's Championship, held in the Philippines.

Eggesvik made her debut for the Philippines in a 3–0 win against Bosnia and Herzegovina. A minute after coming in as a substitute replacing Quinley Quezada in the 81st minute, Eggesvik assisted Sarina Bolden's second goal of the match. In the second match against Bosnia, Eggesvik also came on as a substitute with the Philippines 1–0 down. From a corner, it was her cross that found Quinley Quezada who scored the equalizer in the 85th minute. The Philippines would eventually win 2–1.

Eggesvik scored her first international goal for the Philippines in a 7–0 win against Singapore in the 2022 AFF Women's Championship.

International goals
Scores and results list the Philippines' goal tally first.

Honours

International

Philippines 

 AFF Women's Championship: 2022

References

External links

1997 births
Living people
Sportspeople from Bodø
Citizens of the Philippines through descent
Norwegian women's footballers
Filipino women's footballers
Women's association football midfielders
Philippines women's international footballers
Norwegian expatriate women's footballers
Filipino expatriate  footballers
Norwegian expatriate sportspeople in England
Filipino expatriate sportspeople in England
Expatriate women's footballers in England
Norwegian people of Filipino descent
Medical students